The Commander of the Army is the highest-ranking military officer and commander of the Republic of China Army. The current Commander is Hsu Yen-pu.

List of Chiefs

Chief of Staff (1912–1946)

Commander-in-Chief of the Army (1946–2006)

Commander of the Army (2006–present)

See also
 Chief of the General Staff (Republic of China)
 Commander of the Navy (Taiwan)

References

Taiwan